, also known as Hatsuyuki Sakura: White Graduation, is a Japanese adult visual novel developed and published by Saga Planets under Visual Art's. It was released on February 24, 2012. A manga adaptation was serialized on Comp Ace. The first volume was released on May 25, 2012; volume 2 was released on October 25, 2012. The manga was written and illustrated by Daisuke Takino. A PlayStation Vita port has been released on March 23, 2017, by Entergram, Inc.

Plot
Hatsuyuki Kawano is a third-year student, one of the rare delinquents at his school. He reluctantly shows up in order to fulfill his graduation requirements. As the first snow of the year falls in December, Hatsuyuki encounters a beautiful girl wearing a white dress in the old town. She is wandering the streets in search of a rabbit. A few days later, the girl in the dress, Sakura, transfers into his school to take Hatsuyuki along towards the last winter.

Characters

Main characters

Voiced by: none

Voiced by: Minto Yamaha (Ai Shimizu)
Sakura Tamaki is a mysterious girl Hatsuyuki meets in the ruined old town, while she is searching for her bunny Nemu. She is somewhat weird and likes to use Nemu for BUNNY impersonations, which include things like the simple bunny, bunny-copter, old man’s beard, muffler, etc. She is strangely attracted to Hatsuyuki and has the habit of holding his hands whenever they are together, saying that his hands feel good. Highly allergic to adult themes in conversation, she is prone to scream "pyaa pyaa" and escape the scene whenever she hears it. She attends the same class as Hatsuyuki and seems to be a normal genki girl who gets along with everyone.

Voiced by: Fūri Samoto (Michiru Yuimoto)
Aya Kozakai is Hatsuyuki’s senior by one year. She works with him at a café filled with dolls, while waiting to get into college after failing the college entrance exam. She used to be the student council president and was the perfect student everyone looked up to but did not dare to get close to. No one knows what she is thinking, but she has a curious familiarity with Hatsuyuki despite having already graduated and supposedly never spending time with him before working at the café.

Voiced by: Hana Kiritani (Atsumi Tanezaki)
Yoru Azuma is Hatsuyuki’s junior by one year and an expert ice skater who practices on the skating rinks every day after school. She is so good at it that she once had a shot at competing in the world championship but blew it in the preliminary matches. She is quite popular in school and the most level-headed of the bunch, often stopping Sakura and Nozomu from doing stupid things and providing valuable tsukkomi that only such a level-headed person could muster.

Voiced by: Mitsu Anzu (Mai Kadowaki)
Nozomu Shinonome is Hatsuyuki’s junior by two years and the leader of the committee who guides students on their futures. Having grown up around her older brother Sai’s guy friends, she looks up to Hatsuyuki like a hero and speaks like a boy to forge a “manly” relationship with him. She is kind of air-headed and easily manipulated by Hatsuyuki, though genuinely helpful to anyone who asks for her advice.

Voiced by: Sui Suzumiya (Motomi Nanaho)
Shirokuma is a mysterious loli who claims to have come from Russia despite obviously not being Russian. Everyone calls her Shirokuma, though that is not her real name. She is highly dependent on other people, like a princess shut in her home surrounded by servants.

Secondary characters

Voiced by: Kotomi Nanahara (Kaori Suzumoto)
Ran is Hatsuyuki’s caretaker and guardian, having taken care of him for as long as he can remember. It is an incident involving Ran that propels Hatsuyuki to complete his mission before spring comes.

Voiced by: Iria Hoshizaki (Airi Sakuno)

Voiced by: Yuina (Mei Kojima)

Voiced by: Aoi Kisaragi (Airi Yoshida)

Voiced by: Michi Tanaka

Voiced by: Mitsuki (Keiko Kobayashi)

Voiced by: Miku Nishino (Yoriko Nagata)

Voiced by: Shinichi Chanama

Voiced by: none

Voiced by: Takezo Koike (Hideki Ogihara)

Voiced by: Chisato Suzumori (Keiko Suzuki)

Voiced by: none

Reception
In Getchu.com, Hatsuyuki Sakura was 3rd best selling games during the month of its release and 29th best selling games in March. The game was also Getchu's 7th best selling games for the first half of 2012 and 10th best selling games for 2012.

In Getchu.com's 2012 Bishoujo Game Awards (based on user votes), Hatsuyuki Sakura won first place in overall, with won first place in Scenarios category and Musics Category, 7th in Movies category, 11th in Graphics category, and 20th in Systems category.

References

External links
Official Website 
Hatsuyuki Sakura at the Visual Novel Database

2012 video games
Shōnen manga
Eroge
Japan-exclusive video games
Romance video games
Visual novels
2012 manga
PlayStation Vita games
Windows games
Kadokawa Shoten manga
Video games developed in Japan